Reinsdorf may refer to:

Reinsdorf, Saxony-Anhalt, a municipality in the district Burgenlandkreis, Saxony-Anhalt, Germany 
Reinsdorf, Saxony, a municipality in the district Zwickauer Land, Saxony, Germany
Reinsdorf, Thuringia, a municipality in the district Kyffhäuserkreis, Thuringia, Germany
 August Reinsdorf, German anarchist
 Jerry Reinsdorf, sports teams owner